Southern Leyte's 1st legislative district will be the representation of the province of Southern Leyte in the Congress of the Philippines. Created in 2019 during the 17th Congress, the district will be represented in the lower house of the Congress through its first congressional district after the 2022 elections. The First district is composed of Maasin City, and municipalities of Macrohon, Padre Burgos, Limasawa, Malitbog, Tomas Oppus and Bontoc.

Representation history

Election results

2022

See also 
Legislative districts of Southern Leyte

References 

 

Southern Leyte
Southern Leyte
Politics of Southern Leyte
Constituencies established in 2019